Dorcadion tianshanskii is a species of beetle in the family Cerambycidae. It was described by Suvorov in 1910.

Subspecies
 Dorcadion tianshanskii heptapotamicum Plavilstshikov, 1951
 Dorcadion tianshanskii radkevitshi Suvorov, 1910
 Dorcadion tianshanskii tianshanskii Suvorov, 1910
 Dorcadion tianshanskii vallesum Danilevsky, 1999

See also 
 Dorcadion

References

tianshanskii
Beetles described in 1910